Scott MacArthur (born August 6, 1979) is an American actor and writer. He is best known for playing Jimmy Shepherd, a main character on the Fox comedy series The Mick.

Early life
MacArthur was born in Chicago. He is an alumnus of The Second City in Chicago. His brother is actor Hayes MacArthur.

Career
MacArthur starred in the Fox series The Mick from 2017 to 2018. MacArthur was initially hired as a writer for the series. The Jimmy character was played by Nat Faxon in the original pilot for The Mick, with the knowledge that Faxon would not be able to continue in the role if the pilot got picked up to series. After offering the role to MacArthur, Fox re-shot the pilot prior to the series debut.

MacArthur has also appeared in films, such as The Diabolical (2015) and Answers to Nothing (2011), as well as numerous guest roles on television. He appeared in the 2019 Breaking Bad epilogue film, El Camino: A Breaking Bad Movie, as welder/criminal Neil Kandy. MacArthur appeared in a recurring role in The Righteous Gemstones as Scotty "the Devil", a moronic stuntman turned extortionist.

Filmography

References

External links

1979 births
Living people
American male film actors
American male television actors
21st-century American male actors
Male actors from Chicago